Janet Margaret Todd  (born 10 September 1942) is a British academic and author. She was educated at Cambridge University and the University of Florida, where she undertook a doctorate on the poet John Clare. Much of her work concerns Mary Wollstonecraft, Jane Austen, and their circles.

Career

Academic career
She has worked in universities in Ghana (Cape Coast), Puerto Rico (Mayaguez), North America (New Brunswick), India (New Delhi), England (Norwich).

She was appointed professor of English Literature at Glasgow University in 2000, and was then at Aberdeen University from 2004 until she took up in 2008 the post of president of Lucy Cavendish College, Cambridge, from which she retired in 2015. She is now a full-time novelist and researcher living in Cambridge. She is a Honorary Fellow of Newnham College, Cambridge.

Author
Todd's writing concerns literature and culture of the Restoration and eighteenth and early nineteenth centuries. Over a long career she has published more than 40 critical and biographical books and collections of essays, mainly on women authors, women's writing, cultural history and the development of fiction. She has edited full-scale editions of Mary Wollstonecraft (with Marilyn Butler) and Aphra Behn, as well as individual works of women such as Charlotte Smith, Helen Maria Williams, Mary Shelley, Mary Carleton and Eliza Fenwick.

She is the General Editor of the nine-volume The Cambridge Edition of the Works of Jane Austen, editor of the volume Jane Austen in Context, and co-editing Persuasion and Later Manuscripts and author of the Cambridge Introduction to Jane Austen. In the US she started the first journal devoted to women writers and more recently in the UK she has been the co-founder with Marie Mulvey-Roberts of Women's Writing.

Since retirement, she has revised her biography of Aphra Behn, Aphra Behn: A Secret Life, and published four novels: A Man of Genius, Don't You Know There's a War On?, Jane Austen and Shelley in the Garden, and an Austen spin-off, Lady Susan Plays the Game.  In 2018, she published Radiation Diaries, her account of a month of cancer treatment, a frank, witty and scholarly memoir, and, in 2019, a revised, colour-illustrated edition of Jane Austen's unfinished work, Jane Austen's Sanditon with an Essay by Janet Todd.

Honours
In the 2013 New Year Honours, Todd was appointed an Officer of the Order of the British Empire (OBE) "for services to higher education and literary scholarship".

Selected publications

 (published as Rebel Daughters: Ireland in Conflict in the US)

 Edited with Linda Bree
A Man of Genius, Bitter Lemon Press. 2016. 
Aphra Behn: A Secret Life. Fentum Press. 16 May 2017. .
Radiation Diaries. Fentum Press. 2018. 
 Jane Austen's Sanditon with an Essay by Janet Todd. Fentum Press. 2019. 
 Don't You Know There's a War On?. Fentum Press. 2020.  EBook 
 Jane Austen and Shelley in the Garden. Fentum Press. 2021.  EBook

References

External links
 Janet Todd's homepage
 Profile at Lucy Cavendish College
 Profile at the University of Aberdeen

1942 births
Living people
Academics of the University of Glasgow
Officers of the Order of the British Empire
University of Florida alumni
Academics of the University of East Anglia
Presidents of Lucy Cavendish College, Cambridge
Honorary Fellows of Newnham College, Cambridge
Place of birth missing (living people)
Mary Wollstonecraft scholars
Academics of the University of Aberdeen